AT-9 may mean:

 Curtiss AT-9, aeroplane.
 AT-9 Spiral-2, missile.
 Vienna, a state of Austria; AT-9 is its ISO 3166-2:AT country subdivision code.